Yumi's Cells is a South Korean manhwa series written and illustrated by Lee Dong-gun. This webtoon was released on internet portal Naver Webtoon from April 1, 2015 until November 13, 2020 with a total 512 chapters. The story revolves around Kim Yumi, a 32-year-old office worker, and her brain cells, tiny blue-hooded cells that control her every mood, thought, and action.

Adaptations

Games 
Yumi's Block Pang
Yumi's Cells: My Dream House
Yumi's Cells: The Game

Web novel
Yumi's Cells at Naver Series

Drama
A live-action drama, titled Yumi's Cells, was released on September 17, 2021 in South Korea. On September 8, 2021, TVING announced that the drama had sold broadcast rights in more than 160 countries around the world, including Europe, North America and Southeast Asia.

Animation
An animation series titled Yumi's Cells will be released in 2022 in South Korea.

References

External link
 Yumi's Cells (Korean) at Naver 
 Yumi's Cells (English) at Line Webtoon

South Korean webtoons
2015 webtoon debuts
Romance webtoons
Comedy webtoons
Naver Comics titles